Tall, Dark & Handcuffed is an album by Cex. It is his first album to move away from a straight ahead electronic music sounds and indulge in a more hip-hop based music, complete with rapping by Cex.

Track listing

References 

2002 albums
Cex (musician) albums
Tigerbeat6 albums